Mount Fair is a historic home and farm complex located in Albemarle County, Virginia.  The main house was built about 1848, and is a -story, five bay, frame building with Greek Revival style details. It has a hipped roof with widow's walk and a one-story, one bay porch with a flat roof supported by Doric order columns.  Also on the property are a contributing detached kitchen, a greenhouse, and two contributing structures, an icehouse and a spring house. The tract also has three contributing sites: the ruins of slave quarters, a slave cemetery, and a family cemetery.

It was added to the National Register of Historic Places in 1990.

References

Houses on the National Register of Historic Places in Virginia
Greek Revival houses in Virginia
Houses completed in 1848
Houses in Albemarle County, Virginia
National Register of Historic Places in Albemarle County, Virginia
Slave cabins and quarters in the United States